Lieutenant General John Sinvula Mutwa  (23 September 1960 – 17 June 2021) was a Namibian military officer whose last appointment was as chief of the Namibian Defence Force (NDF). He was appointed the commander of the Namibian Army in 2011, and NDF Chief on 31 December 2013, a position from which he retired on 31 March 2020.

Career

PLAN
Mutwa's military career began in 1975 when he joined the Peoples Liberational Army of Namibia in Zambia. In 1976 he underwent military training in Kongwa, Tanzania, and completed the officer cadet course. In 1978 he then completed the Intelligence and Counter Intelligence Course in the former Yugoslavia. Between 1979 to 1980 he was the Regional Staff Officer for Administration on the Eastern Front, while between 1980 to 1989 he was the regional chief of reconnaissance at the eastern and northern fronts.

NDF
In 1990 he joined the Namibian Defence Force as a pioneer and was given the rank of lieutenant Colonel and appointed assistant director: military intelligence. In 1994 he was reassigned as the commanding officer of Namibia's logistic support battalion in Grootfontein with the same rank. In 1996 he was promoted to colonel and appointed army chief of staff in the office of the army commander. In 1998 he was redeployed as the army chief of staff: personnel and logistics, in this position he was then deployed to Operation Atlantic, Namibia's contribution to the SADC allied forces to the DRC during the Second Congo War. While deployed in DRC he was appointed the chief of staff of the SADC Allied Forces between 1999 and 2000 and seconded as a commissioner on the Joint Military Commission on DRC in 2000. Namibia's Operation Atlantic ended in 2002 with all troops deployed back to Namibia. In 2004 he was appointed the Defence Attache to Angola. In 2006 he was promoted to brigadier general and appointed the chief of staff logistics at Defence HQ. Mutwa was appointed commander of the army in April 2011. At this occasion, he was promoted from brigadier general to major general. He served in that position until 31 December 2013, when he took over the position as NDF Chief from Lieutenant General Epaphras Denga Ndaitwah.

Qualifications
1976– Officer Cadet Course – Tanzania

1981 – 1982 Political Science and Leadership Course – USSR.

1993 – 1994 Senior Command and Staff Course- United States.

1995 Military Logistics Officers Course – UK.

1996 Advanced Military Law Course at the UNAM.

1997 Defence Executive Management Course joint programme between the University of Witwatersrand & UNAM.

1998 – 1999 National Security Strategy Course- South Africa.

Honours and decorations
 Excellent Order of the Eagle, First Class.

  Namibian Army Pioneer Medal
  Mandume Ya Ndemufayo Operation Medal
  Independence Medal
  Army Ten Years Service Medal
  Army Twenty Years Service Medal
  Campaign Medal 
  NDF Commendation Medal

Private life
Mutwa was married with three children. He died on 17 June 2021 at Katima Mulilo. He was declared a national hero of Namibia and awarded a state funeral. President Hage Geingob also declared three days of mourning. He was interred with full  military honours at Mahundu village in the Zambezi Region on 01 July 2021.

References

1960 births
2021 deaths
Namibian military personnel
People's Liberation Army of Namibia personnel
National heroes of Namibia